The 2015 Minnesota Twins season  was the 55th season for the franchise in the Twin Cities of Minnesota, their sixth season at Target Field and the 115th overall in the American League. The team finished second in the AL Central with an 83–79 record, their best overall result since the 2010 season, which was the last year they made the playoffs.  The team remained in the running for a wild card berth in the American League playoffs until losing Game 161 (their second to last).  They would eventually win a wild card berth two years later, in 2017. In between, however, the team lost 103 games.

After seven years away, outfielder Torii Hunter returned for his twelfth year as a Twin.  Lauded rookies Eddie Rosario, Miguel Sano and Byron Buxton arrived from the minors; each tallied their first big-league hit, home run and run batted in.  In Rosario's case, he did all three on May 6 on the first big-league pitch he saw, just the twenty-ninth player in history to do so. In May, the Twins had a month record of 20-7, which was the best month for the franchise since June 1991, the last year they won the World Series.

Offseason

October 30: Jared Burton becomes a free agent.
Week of November 11: Signed 4 players to a minor league contract and invited 3 of them to spring training.
November 20: Signed 3 players to a minor league contract (2 with a spring training invite) and promoted 4 players from the minors.
November 25: Sent Anthony Swarzak to the minors.
December 3: Signed Torii Hunter to a one-year, $10.5 million contract.
December 5: Signed Shane Robinson to a minor league contract and invited him to spring training.
December 11: Drafted J. R. Graham.
December 13: Signed Ervin Santana and Carlos Paulino (minor league contract) while sending Chris Parmelee to the minors.
Week of December 15: Signed 5 players to a minor league contract (1 with an invite to Spring training) and invited 11 others to spring training.
December 23: Signed Tim Stauffer.
December 31: Signed Blaine Boyer to a minor league contract and invited him to spring training.
Week of January 7: Signed 3 players to a minor league contract.

Season standings

American League Central

American League Wild Card

Record against opponents

Season summary
New manager Paul Molitor oversaw a winning season (83-79) for his Minnesota club, following four consecutive seasons of 90 or more losses under previous manager Ron Gardenhire.

2.22 million fans attended Twins games at Target Field, the ninth highest total in the American League.

The season brought some "Twins' firsts" and broke or matched several longstanding club records:

 Facing Detroit, the Twins began the season with 24.1 scoreless innings, a club record in futility. Paul Molitor didn't get his first win until the fourth game. Among Twins managers, only Billy Martin in 1969 waited longer for his first victory.
 On May 6, rookie outfielder Eddie Rosario hit a Target Field home run on the first major league pitch he saw, something no other Twin has done.
 On June 14, three Twins hit triples in the sixth inning, a Twins first. Oddly, the Twins only scored one run in the inning. With another triple two innings earlier, the power burst added up to the club's first four-triple game since 1964. All four three-baggers were hit off Texas Rangers' starter Nick Martinez.
 In the week prior to All-Star Game, second baseman Brian Dozier belted two walk-off home runs, the first time a Twin has done that within one week. Dozier was a late addition to the American League All-Star roster as an injury replacement.
 Relief pitcher Glen Perkins set club records with 28 consecutive saves to start the season.
 Rookie Miguel Sano was called up, and blasted ten home runs in his first 41 games—the fastest start for any Twins or Washington Senators rookie.
 Eddie Rosario set a Twins rookie record by tallying fifteen triples (which led the major leagues) and tied the late Kirby Puckett's 1984 rookie club record with sixteen outfield assists.
 On September 24, first baseman Joe Mauer reached base safely in his 43rd straight game, setting a Minnesota record.  The record had been held by Harmon Killebrew at 40 in 1970.
 Two days later, third baseman Trevor Plouffe grounded into his major-league-leading 28th double play.  The tally tied Harmon Killebrew, in the 1970 season, for the Minnesota record.
 On Oct. 1, Brian Dozier struck out for the 146th time this season.  His season finished with 148 strikeouts, topping the previous club record of 145, set by Bobby Darwin in 1972.

Two Twins made the All-Star Game: relief pitcher Glen Perkins and second baseman Brian Dozier. In the eighth inning, Dozier pinch hit and homered off Mark Melancon in his only at-bat in Cincinnati's Great American Ball Park. Perkins pitched the ninth inning in the AL's 6-3 win.

Pitchers Phil Hughes and Kyle Gibson each finished with eleven wins for tops in the Win column. No pitcher lost more than eleven games. Eight Twins finished with ten or more homers.

Game log

|- bgcolor="ffbbbb"
| 1 || April 6 || @ Tigers || 0−4 || Price (1−0) || Hughes (0−1) || Nathan (1) || 45,030 || 0–1
|- bgcolor="ffbbbb"
| 2 || April 8 || @ Tigers || 0−11 || Sánchez (1−0) || Nolasco (0−1) || — || 28,280 || 0−2
|- bgcolor="ffbbbb"
| 3 || April 9 || @ Tigers || 1–7 || Greene (1−0)  || Gibson (0−1)  || — || 26,782 || 0–3
|- bgcolor="bbffbb"
| 4 || April 10 || @ White Sox || 6–0 || Milone (1−0)  || Noesí (0−1)  || Duensing (1) || 38,533 || 1–3
|- bgcolor="ffbbbb"
| 5 || April 11 || @ White Sox || 4–5 || Duke (1−0)  || Boyer (0−1)  || Robertson (1) || 22,317 || 1–4
|- bgcolor="ffbbbb"
| 6 || April 12 || @ White Sox || 2–6 || Sale (1−0)  || Hughes (0−2) || — || 23,057 || 1–5
|- bgcolor="ffbbbb"
| 7 || April 13 || Royals || 3–12 || Duffy (1−0) || May (0−1) || — || 40,123 || 1–6
|- bgcolor="bbffbb"
| 8 || April 15 || Royals || 3–1 || Gibson (1−1) || Vólquez (1−1) || Perkins (1) || 21,362 || 2–6
|- bgcolor="bbffbb"
| 9 || April 16 || Royals || 8–5 || Milone (2−0) || Vargas (1−1) || Perkins (2) || 17,449 || 3–6
|- bgcolor="bbffbb"
| 10 || April 17 || Indians || 3–2 (11)  || Boyer (1−1) || Shaw (0−1) || — || 21,307 || 4–6
|- bgcolor="ffbbbb"
| 11 || April 18 || Indians || 2–4 || Salazar (1−0) || Hughes (0−3) || Allen (3) || 23,949 || 4–7
|- bgcolor="bbffbb"
| 12 || April 19 || Indians || 7–2 || May (1−1) || House (0−2) || — || 17,923 || 5–7
|- bgcolor="ffbbbb"
| 13 || April 20 || @ Royals || 1–7 || Vólquez (2−1) || Gibson (1−2) || — || 20,393 || 5–8
|- bgcolor="ffbbbb"
| 14 || April 21 || @ Royals || 5–6 || Young (1–0) || Fien (0–1) || Davis (3) || 20,990 || 5–9
|- bgcolor="bbffbb"
| 15 || April 22 || @ Royals || 3–0 || Pelfrey (1–0) || Guthrie (1–1) || Perkins (3) || 24,721 || 6–9
|- bgcolor="ffbbbb"
| 16 || April 24 || @ Mariners || 0–2 || Hernández (3–0) || Hughes (0–4) || — || 25,215 || 6–10
|- bgcolor="bbffbb"
| 17 || April 25 || @ Mariners || 8–5 || Stauffer (1–0) || Paxton (0–2) || Perkins (4) || 33,566 || 7–10
|- bgcolor="bbffbb"
| 18 || April 26 || @ Mariners || 4–2 (11) || Fien (1–1) || Olson (1–1) || Perkins (5) || 35,242 || 8–10
|- bgcolor="ffbbbb"
| 19 || April 27 || Tigers || 4–5 || Price (2–1) || Milone (2–1) || Soria (8) || 18,054 || 8–11
|- bgcolor="bbffbb"
| 20 || April 28 || Tigers || 3–2 || Pelfrey (2–0) || Sánchez (1–3) || Perkins (6) || 18,169 || 9–11
|- bgcolor="ffbbbb"
| 21 || April 29 || Tigers || 7–10 || Gorzelanny (1–1) || Fien (1–2) || Soria (9) || 19,447 || 9–12
|- bgcolor="bbffbb"
| 22 || April 30 || White Sox || 12–2 || May (2–1) || Sale (2–1) || — || 20,736 || 10–12
|-

|- bgcolor="bbffbb"
| 23 || May 1 || White Sox || 1–0 || Gibson (2–2) || Quintana (1–2) || Perkins (7) || 22,794 || 11–12
|- bgcolor="bbffbb"
| 24 || May 2 || White Sox || 5–3 || Nolasco (1–1) || Noesí (0–3) || Perkins (8) || 30,551 || 12–12
|- bgcolor="bbffbb"
| 25 || May 3 || White Sox || 13–3 || Pressly (1–0) || Danks (1–3) || — || 22,423 || 13–12
|- bgcolor="bbffbb"
| 26 || May 4 || Athletics || 8–7 || Hughes (1–4) || Hahn (1–2) || Perkins (9) || 20,605 || 14–12
|- bgcolor="ffbbbb"
| 27 || May 5 || Athletics || 1–2 || Chavez (1–2) || May (2–2) || Clippard (3) || 18,135 || 14–13
|- bgcolor="bbffbb"
| 28 || May 6 || Athletics || 13–0 || Gibson (3–2) || Kazmir (2–1) || — || 18,866 || 15–13
|- bgcolor="bbffbb"
| 29 || May 7 || Athletics || 6–5 || Nolasco (2–1) || Pomeranz (1–3) || Perkins (10) || 22,379 || 16–13
|- bgcolor="bbffbb"
| 30 || May 8 || @ Indians || 9–3 ||Pelfrey (3–0) || Bauer (3–3) || — || 19,102 || 17–13
|- bgcolor="bbffbb"
| 31 || May 9 || @ Indians || 7–4 ||Hughes (2–4)  || Chen (0–1) || Perkins (11) || 16,199 || 18–13
|- bgcolor="ffbbbb"
| 32 || May 10 || @ Indians || 2–8 || Salazar (4–1)  ||May (2–3) || — || 13,769 || 18–14
|- bgcolor="ffbbbb"
| 33 || May 12 || @ Tigers || 1-2 (10) || Nesbitt (1–1) ||Pressly (1–1)  || — || 26,177 || 18–15
|- bgcolor="bbffbb"
| 34 || May 13 || @ Tigers || 6–2 ||Nolasco (3–1) || Kyle Lobstein (3–3) || — || 27,163 || 19–15
|- bgcolor="ffbbbb"
| 35 || May 14 || @ Tigers || 1–13 || Sánchez (3–4) ||Pelfrey (3–1)  || — || 31,785 || 19–16
|- bgcolor="bbffbb"
| 36 || May 15 || Rays || 3–2 ||Hughes (3–4) || Odorizzi (3–3) || Perkins (12) || 24,018 || 20–16
|- bgcolor="bbffbb"
| 37 || May 16 || Rays || 6–4 ||Duensing (1–0) || Jepsen (1–3) || Perkins (13) || 27,128 || 21–16
|- bgcolor="ffbbbb"
| 38 || May 17 || Rays || 3–11 || Archer (4–4) ||Gibson (3–3) || — || 23,708 || 21–17
|- bgcolor="bbffbb"
| 39 || May 19 || @ Pirates || 8–5 ||Nolasco (4–1) || Liriano (1–4) || Perkins (14) || 22,357 || 22–17
|- bgcolor="bbffbb"
| 40 || May 20 || @ Pirates || 4–3 (13) || Duensing (2–0) || Bastardo (0–1) || Perkins (15) || 21,718 || 23–17
|- bgcolor="ffbbbb"
| 41 || May 22 || @ White Sox || 2–3 || Samardzija (4–2) ||  Thompson (0–1) || Robertson (9) || 21,067 || 23–18
|- bgcolor="bbffbb"
| 42 || May 23 || @ White Sox || 4–3 || May (3–3) || Sale (3–2) || Perkins (16) || 38,714 || 24–18
|- bgcolor="bbffbb"
| 43 || May 24 || @ White Sox || 8–1 || Gibson (4–3) || Quintana (2–5) || — || 30,180 || 25–18
|- bgcolor="bbffbb"
| 44 || May 25 || Red Sox || 7–2 || Nolasco (5–1) || Kelly (1–4) || — || 29,472 || 26–18
|- bgcolor="bbffbb"
| 45 || May 26 || Red Sox || 2–1 || Pelfrey (4–1) || Buchholz (2–6) || Perkins (17) || 23,268 || 27–18
|- bgcolor="bbffbb"
| 46 || May 27 || Red Sox || 6–4 || Hughes (4–4) || Porcello (4–4) || Perkins (18) || 30,027 || 28–18
|- bgcolor="ffbbbb"
| 47 || May 29 || Blue Jays || 4–6 || Buehrle (6–4) || Perkins (0–1)|| — || 24,509 || 28–19
|- bgcolor="bbffbb"
| 48 || May 30 || Blue Jays || 3–2 || Pressly (2–1) || Loup (1–3) || Boyer (1) || 32,076 || 29–19
|- bgcolor="bbffbb"
| 49 || May 31 || Blue Jays || 6–5 || Pressly (3–1) || Osuna (1–2) || Perkins (19) || 33,829 || 30–19
|-

|- bgcolor="bbbbbb"
| – || June 1 || @ Red Sox ||colspan="8" | Postponed (rain) (Makeup date: June 3)
|- bgcolor="ffbbbb"
| 50 || June 2 || @ Red Sox || 0–1 || Buchholz (3–6) || Pelfrey (4–2) || Uehara (11) || 32,622 || 30–20
|- bgcolor="ffbbbb"
| 51 || June 3 || @ Red Sox || 3–6 || Rodríguez (2–0) || Hughes (4–5) || — || 31,704 || 30–21
|- bgcolor="bbffbb"
| 52 || June 3 || @ Red Sox || 2–0 || May (4–3) || Porcello (4–5) || Perkins (20) || 33,291 || 31–21
|- bgcolor="bbffbb"
| 53 || June 4 || @ Red Sox || 8–4 || Thompson (1–1) || Uehara (2–3) || — || 33,615 || 32–21
|- bgcolor="ffbbbb"
| 54 || June 5 || Brewers || 5–10 || Jeffress (2–0) || Boyer (1–2) || — || 29,398 || 32–22
|- bgcolor="ffbbbb"
| 55 || June 6 || Brewers || 2–4 || Garza (4–7) || Pressly (3–2) || Rodríguez (10) || 38,707 || 32–23
|- bgcolor="bbffbb"
| 56 || June 7 || Brewers || 2–0 || Pelfrey (5–2) || Fiers (2–6) || Perkins (21)|| 31,911 || 33–23
|- bgcolor="ffbbbb"
| 57 || June 8 || Royals || 1–3 || Vargas (5–2) || Hughes (4–6) || Holland (10) || 22,796 || 33–24
|- bgcolor="ffbbbb"
| 58 || June 9 || Royals || 0–2 || Young (5–2) || May (4–4) || Holland (11) || 22,497 || 33–25
|- bgcolor="ffbbbb"
| 59 || June 10 || Royals || 2–7 || Vólquez (5–4) || Gibson (4–4) || — || 28,434 || 33–26
|- bgcolor="ffbbbb"
| 60 || June 12 || @ Rangers || 1–2 || Scheppers (3–0) || Thompson (1–2) || — || 41,765 || 33–27
|- bgcolor="ffbbbb"
| 61 || June 13 || @ Rangers || 7–11 || Lewis (6–3) || Pelfrey (5–3) || — || 28,661 || 33–28
|- bgcolor="bbffbb"
| 62 || June 14 || @ Rangers || 4–3 || Fien (2–2) || Tolleson (1–1) || Perkins (22) || 33,970 || 34–28
|- bgcolor="ffbbbb"
| 63 || June 15 || @ Cardinals || 2–3 || Lackey (5–4) || May (4–5) || Siegrist (2) || 43,174 || 34–29
|- bgcolor="ffbbbb"
| 64 || June 16 || @ Cardinals || 2–3 || Wacha (9–2) || Gibson (4–5) || Siegrist (3) || 41,203 || 34–30
|- bgcolor="bbffbb"
| 65 || June 17 || Cardinals || 3–1 || Milone (3–1) || Martínez (7–3) || Perkins (23) || 34,381 || 35–30
|- bgcolor="bbffbb"
| 66 || June 18 || Cardinals || 2–1 || Boyer (2–2) || Villanueva (3–2) || — || 34,648 || 36–30
|- bgcolor="bbffbb"
| 67 || June 19 || Cubs || 7–2 || Hughes (5–6) || Hendricks (2–3) || — || 36,817 || 37–30
|- bgcolor="ffbbbb"
| 68 || June 20 || Cubs || 1–4 || Motte (4–1) || Boyer (2–3) || Rondon (12) || 40,066 || 37–31
|- bgcolor="ffbbbb"
| 69 || June 21 || Cubs || 0–8 || Arrieta (7–5) || Gibson (4–6) || — || 40,273 || 37–32
|- bgcolor="bbffbb"
| 70 || June 22 || White Sox || 13–2 || Milone (4–1) || Danks (3–8) || — || 24,094 || 38–32
|- bgcolor="ffbbbb"
| 71 || June 23 || White Sox || 2–6 || Samardzija (5–4) || Pelfrey (5–4) || Petricka (2) || 27,349 || 38–33
|- bgcolor="bbffbb"
| 72 || June 24 || White Sox || 6–1 || Hughes (6–6) || Sale (6–4) || — || 28,854 || 39–33
|- bgcolor="ffbbbb"
| 73 || June 26 || @ Brewers || 4–10 || Lohse (4–9) || May (4–6) || — || 33,296 || 39–34
|- bgcolor="bbffbb"
| 74 || June 27 || @ Brewers || 5–2 || Gibson (5–6) || Garza (4–10) || Perkins (24) || 39,977 || 40–34
|- bgcolor="ffbbbb"
| 75 || June 28 || @ Brewers || 3–5 || Smith (4–0) || Fien (2–3) || — || 38,958 || 40–35
|- bgcolor="ffbbbb"
| 76 || June 29 || @ Reds || 7–11 || Adcock (1–1) || Pelfrey (5–5) || — || 28,904 || 40–36
|- bgcolor="bbffbb"
| 77 || June 30 || @ Reds || 8–5 || Hughes (7–6) || DeSclafani (5–6) || Perkins (25) || 28,556 || 41–36
|-

|- bgcolor="ffbbbb"
| 78 || July 1 || @ Reds || 1–2 || Cueto (5–5) || May (4–7) || Chapman (16) || 26,459 || 41–37
|- bgcolor="bbffbb"
| 79 || July 2 || @ Royals || 2–0 || Gibson (6–6) || Young (7–4) || Perkins (26) || 37,196 || 42–37
|- bgcolor="ffbbbb"
| 80 || July 3 || @ Royals || 2–3 || Davis (4–1) || Thompson (1–3) || — || 38,868 || 42–38
|- bgcolor="bbffbb"
| 81 || July 4 || @ Royals || 5–3 || Duensing (3–0) || Blanton (2–2) || Perkins (27) || 37,917 || 43–38
|- bgcolor="ffbbbb"
| 82 || July 5 || @ Royals || 2–3 || Holland (2–0) || Boyer (2–4) || — || 29,427 || 43–39
|- bgcolor="bbffbb"
| 83 || July 6 || Orioles || 4–2 || May (5–7) || Hunter (2–2) || — || 23,213 || 44–39
|- bgcolor="bbffbb"
| 84 || July 7 || Orioles || 8–3 || Gibson (7–6) || Gausman (1–1) || — || 25,091 || 45–39
|- bgcolor="bbffbb"
| 85 || July 8 || Orioles || 5–3 || Milone (5–1) || Norris (2–9) || Perkins (28) || 29,289 || 46–39
|- bgcolor="ffbbbb"
| 86 || July 9 || Tigers || 2–4 || Price (9–2) || Pelfrey (5–6) || Soria (20) || 29,724 || 46–40
|- bgcolor="bbffbb"
| 87 || July 10 || Tigers || 8–6 || May (6–7) || Soria (3–1) || — || 31,545 || 47–40
|- bgcolor="bbffbb"
| 88 || July 11 || Tigers || 9–5 || Hughes (8–6) || Simón (8–6) || — || 32,365 || 48–40
|- bgcolor="bbffbb"
| 89 || July 12 || Tigers || 7–1 || Gibson (8–6) || Greene (4–7) || — || 27,936 || 49–40
|- bgcolor=#bbb
| – || July 14 || 86th All-Star Game || colspan=6 | National League vs. American League (Great American Ball Park, Cincinnati)
|- bgcolor="bbffbb"
| 90 || July 17 || @ Athletics || 5–0 || Santana (1–0)  || Gray (10–4)  || — || 23,462  || 50–40
|- bgcolor="ffbbbb"
| 91 || July 18 || @ Athletics || 2–3  (10)   || Pomeranz (4–3) || Fien (2–4)  || — || 30,778  || 50–41
|- bgcolor="ffbbbb"
| 92 || July 19 || @ Athletics || 1–14 || Chavez (5–9)  || Milone (5–2)  || — || 20,286  || 50–42
|- bgcolor="ffbbbb"
| 93 || July 21 || @ Angels || 0–7 || Shoemaker (5–7) || Gibson (8–7)  || — || 38,937 || 50–43
|- bgcolor="ffbbbb"
| 94 || July 22 || @ Angels || 2–5 || Wilson (8–7)  || Pelfrey (5–7)  || Street (25) || 40,239 || 50–44
|- bgcolor="bbffbb"
| 95 || July 23 || @ Angels || 3–0 || Santana (2–0)  || Richards (10–7)  || Perkins (29)  || 36,134  || 51–44
|- bgcolor="bbffbb"
| 96 || July 24 || Yankees || 10–1 || Hughes (9–6)  || Pineda (9–7) || — || 34,334  || 52–44
|- bgcolor="ffbbbb"
| 97 || July 25 || Yankees || 5–8 || Warren (6–5)  || Perkins (0–2)  || Miller (23)  || 40,660 || 52–45
|- bgcolor="ffbbbb"
| 98 || July 26 || Yankees || 2–7 || Eovaldi (10–2) || Gibson (8–8)  || — || 37,391 || 52–46
|- bgcolor="ffbbbb"
| 99 || July 28 || Pirates || 7–8 || Melancon (2–1) || Perkins (0–3)  || — || 30,795 || 52–47
|- bgcolor="ffbbbb"
| 100 || July 29 || Pirates || 4–10 || Liriano (7–6) || Santana (2–1) || — || 37,273 || 52–48
|- bgcolor="bbffbb"
| 101 || July 30 || Mariners || 9–5 || Hughes (10–6) || Happ (4–6) || — || 30,534 || 53–48
|- bgcolor="ffbbbb"
| 102 || July 31 || Mariners || 1–6 || Walker (8–7) || Milone (5–3) || — || 27,643 || 53–49
|-

|- bgcolor="bbffbb"
| 103 || August 1 || Mariners || 3–2 || May (7–7) || Smith (1–5) || — || 36,901 || 54–49
|- bgcolor="ffbbbb"
| 104 || August 2 || Mariners || 1–4  (11)  || Rodney (4–4) || Jepsen (2–6) || Wilhelmsen (2) || 30,325 || 54–50
|- bgcolor="ffbbbb"
| 105 || August 3 || @ Blue Jays || 1–5 || Price (10–4) || Santana (2–2) || — || 45,766 || 54–51
|- bgcolor="ffbbbb"
| 106 || August 4 || @ Blue Jays || 1–3 || Estrada (9–6) || Hughes (10–7) || Osuna (8) || 26,504 || 54–52
|- bgcolor="ffbbbb"
| 107 || August 5 || @ Blue Jays || 7–9 || Hutchison (10–2) || Duffey (0–1) || Hawkins (3) || 27,725 || 54–53
|- bgcolor="ffbbbb"
| 108 || August 6 || @ Blue Jays || 3–9 || Buehrle (12–5) || Gibson (8–9) || — || 34,847 || 54–54
|- bgcolor="bbffbb"
| 109 || August 7 || @ Indians || 10–9 || May (8–7) || Shaw (1–2) || Perkins (30) || 30,365 || 55–54
|- bgcolor="ffbbbb"
| 110 || August 8 || @ Indians || 4–17 || Bauer (9–8) || Santana (2–3) || — || 31,666 || 55–55
|- bgcolor="ffbbbb"
| 111 || August 9 || @ Indians || 1–8 || Kluber (7–12) || Hughes (10–8) || — || 31,666 || 55–56
|- bgcolor="bbffbb"
| 112 || August 11 || Rangers || 3–2 || Perkins (1–3) || Patton (1–1) || — || 26,663 || 56–56
|- bgcolor="bbffbb"
| 113 || August 12 || Rangers || 11–1 || Pelfrey (6–7) || Martinez (7–7) || — || 30,683 || 57–56
|- bgcolor="ffbbbb"
| 114 || August 13 || Rangers || 5–6 || Kela (6–5) || Fien (2–5) || Tolleson (21) || 30,357 || 57–57
|- bgcolor="ffbbbb"
| 115 || August 14 || Indians || 1–6 || Kluber (8–12) || May (8–8) || — || 26,910 || 57–58
|- bgcolor="bbffbb"
| 116 || August 15 || Indians || 4–1 || Duffey (1–1) || Tomlin (0–1) || — || 30,601 || 58–58
|- bgcolor="bbffbb"
| 117 || August 16 || Indians || 4–1 || Milone (6–3) || Carrasco (11–9) || Perkins (31) || 27,244 || 59–58
|- bgcolor="ffbbbb"
| 118 || August 17 || @ Yankees || 7–8  (10)  || Miller (1–2) || Perkins (1–4) || — || 38,943 || 59–59
|- bgcolor="ffbbbb"
| 119 || August 18 || @ Yankees || 4–8 || Rumbelow (1–0) || Graham (0–1) || Miller (27) || 38,007 || 59–60
|- bgcolor="ffbbbb"
| 120 || August 19 || @ Yankees || 3–4 || Eovaldi (13–2) || Santana (2–4) || Betances (8) || 38,086 || 59–61
|- bgcolor="bbffbb"
| 121 || August 20 || @ Orioles || 15–2 || Duffey (2–1) || González (9–9) || — || 20,109 || 60–61
|- bgcolor="bbffbb"
| 122 || August 21 || @ Orioles || 4–3 || Fien (3–5) || O'Day (5–2) || Jepsen (6) || 32,025 || 61–61
|- bgcolor="bbffbb"
| 123 || August 22 || @ Orioles || 3–2 || Fien (4–5) || Tillman (9–8) || Jepsen (7) || 35,301 || 62–61
|- bgcolor="bbffbb" 
| 124 || August 23 || @ Orioles || 4–3 (12) || Perkins (2–4) || Matusz (1–3) || Milone (1) || 35,144 || 63–61
|- bgcolor="bbffbb"
| 125 || August 25 || @ Rays || 11–7 || Graham (1–1) || Andriese (3–4) || — || 9,632 || 64–61
|- bgcolor="bbffbb"
| 126 || August 26 || @ Rays || 5–3 || Duensing (4–0) || Archer (11–10) || Jepsen (8) || 9,205 || 65–61
|- bgcolor="ffbbbb"
| 127 || August 27 || @ Rays || 4–5 || Gomes (2–4) || Milone (6–4) || Boxberger (31) || 9,375 || 65–62
|- bgcolor="bbffbb"
| 128 || August 28 || Astros || 3–0 || Gibson (9–9) || Kazmir (7–9) || Jepsen (9) || 28,636 || 66–62
|- bgcolor="ffbbbb"
| 129 || August 29 || Astros || 1–4 || Fiers (2–0) || Pelfrey (6–8) || Gregerson (25) || 38,876 || 66–63
|- bgcolor="bbffbb"
| 130 || August 30 || Astros || 7–5 || Santana (3–4) || McCullers (5–5) || — || 28,877 || 67–63
|-

|- bgcolor="bbffbb"
| 131 || September 1 || White Sox || 8–6 || Jepsen (3-6) || Duke (3-5) || Perkins (32) || 25,803 || 68–63
|- bgcolor="bbffbb"
| 132 || September 2 || White Sox || 3–0 || Milone (7-4) || Rodón (6-6) || Jepsen (10) || 22,162 || 69–63
|- bgcolor="ffbbbb"
| 133 || September 3 || White Sox || 4–6 || Samardzija (9-11) || Fien (4–6) || Robertson (28) || 25,339 || 69–64
|- bgcolor="ffbbbb"
| 134 || September 4 || @ Astros || 0–8 || McHugh (15-7) || Pelfrey (6–9) || — || 27,807 || 69–65
|- bgcolor="bbffbb"
| 135 || September 5 || @ Astros || 3–2 || Santana (4–4) || Gregerson (7-3) || Jepsen (11) || 27,643 || 70–65
|- bgcolor="ffbbbb"
| 136 || September 6 || @ Astros || 5–8 || Keuchel (17-6) || May (8-9) || Gregerson (26) || 37,648 || 70–66
|- bgcolor="bbffbb"
| 137 || September 7 || @ Royals || 6–2 || Milone (8-4) || Ventura (10-8) || — || 36,825 || 71–66
|- bgcolor="ffbbbb"
| 138 || September 8 || @ Royals || 2–4 || Vólquez (13-7) || Gibson (9-10) || Holland (30) || 31,834 || 71–67
|- bgcolor="bbffbb"
| 139 || September 9 || @ Royals || 3–2 (12) || Boyer (3-4) || Morales (3-2) || Jepsen (12) || 32,286 || 72–67
|- bgcolor="bbffbb"
| 140 || September 11 || @ White Sox || 6–2 || Santana (5–4) || Jones (1-2) || — || 15,641 || 73–67
|- bgcolor="ffbbbb"
| 141 || September 12 || @ White Sox || 2–8 || Quintana (9-10) || Milone (8-5) || — || 26.065 || 73–68
|- bgcolor="bbffbb"
| 142 || September 13 || @ White Sox || 7–0 || Gibson (10-10) || Sale (12-9) || — || 23,159 || 74–68
|- bgcolor="bbffbb"
| 143 || September 14 || Tigers || 7–1 || Duffey (3-1) || Lobstein (3-8) || — || 17,833 || 75–68
|- bgcolor="ffbbbb"
| 144 || September 15 || Tigers || 4–5 || Simón (13-9) || Hughes (10-9) || Rondón (5) || 22,963 || 75–69
|- bgcolor="ffbbbb"
| 145 || September 16 || Tigers || 4–7 (12) || Krol (2-3) || Duensing (4-1) || — || 22,509 || 75–70
|- bgcolor="ffbbbb"
| 146 || September 17 || Angels || 8–11 || Morin (2-1) || Achter (0-1) || Street (36)|| 18,697 || 75–71
|- bgcolor="bbbbbb"
| – || September 18 || Angels ||colspan="8" | Postponed (rain) (Makeup date: September 19)
|- bgcolor="ffbbbb"
| 147 || September 19 || Angels || 3–4 (12) || Morin (3-1) || Boyer (3-5) || Street (37) || 22,878 || 75–72
|- bgcolor="ffbbbb"
| 148 || September 19 || Angels || 2–5 || Richards (14-11) || Pelfrey (6–10) || Street (38) || 33,300 || 75–73
|- bgcolor="bbffbb"
| 149 || September 20 || Angels || 8–1 || Duffey (4-1) || Shoemaker (7-10) || — || 25,302 || 76–73
|- bgcolor="bbffbb"
| 150 || September 22 || Indians || 3–1 || Santana (6–4) || Salazar (13−9) || Jepsen (13) ||  || 77–73
|- bgcolor="bbffbb"
| 151 || September 23 || Indians || 4–2 || Hughes (11-9) || Kluber (8-15) || — || 17,831 || 78–73
|- bgcolor="ffbbbb"
| 152 || September 24 || Indians || 3–6 || Anderson (6-3) || Gibson (10−11) || Allen (32) || 21,366 || 78–74
|- bgcolor="ffbbbb"
| 153 || September 25 || @ Tigers || 4–6 || Wilson (3-3) || Perkins (2-5) || Feliz (9) || 31,153 || 78–75
|- bgcolor="bbffbb"
| 154 || September 26 || @ Tigers || 6–2 || Duffey (5-1) || Simón (13–11) || — || 32,753 || 79–75
|- bgcolor="bbffbb"
| 155 || September 27 || @ Tigers || 7–1 || Santana (7–4) || Wolf (0-5) || — || 33,517 || 80–75
|- bgcolor="bbffbb"
| 156 || September 28 || @ Indians || 4–2 || Milone (9-5) || Kluber (8-16) || Jepsen (14) || 10,007 || 81–75
|- bgcolor="bbbbbb"
| – || September 29 || @ Indians ||colspan="8" | Postponed (rain) (Makeup date: September 30)
|- bgcolor="bbffbb"
| 157 || September 30 || @ Indians || 7–1 || Gibson (11-11) || Carrasco (14-12) || — || 0 || 82–75
|- bgcolor="ffbbbb"
| 158 || September 30 || @ Indians || 2–10 || Anderson (7-3) || Pelfrey (6–11) || — || 10,228 || 82–76
|-

|- bgcolor="bbffbb"
| 159 || October 1 || @ Indians || 4–2 || Perkins (3-5) || Allen (2-5) || Jepsen (14) || 22,644 || 83–76
|- bgcolor="ffbbbb"
| 160 || October 2 || Royals || 1–3 || Coleman (1-0) || Santana (7–5) || Davis (16) || 31,534 || 83–77
|- bgcolor="ffbbbb"
| 161 || October 3 || Royals || 1–5 || Ventura (13-8) || Boyer (3-6) || Davis (17) || 30,181 || 83–78
|- bgcolor="ffbbbb"
| 162 || October 4 || Royals || 1–6 || Cueto (11-13) || Nolasco' (5-2) || — || 24,108 || 83–79
|-

|-
| Legend:       = Win       = Loss       = PostponementBold = Twins team memberRoster

Statistics

BattingNote: G = Games played; AB = At bats; R = Runs scored; H = Hits; 2B = Doubles; 3B = Triples; HR = Home runs; RBI = Runs batted in; BB = Base on balls; SO = Strikeouts; AVG = Batting average; SB = Stolen basesPitchingNote: W = Wins; L = Losses; ERA = Earned run average; G = Games pitched; GS = Games started; SV = Saves; IP = Innings pitched; H = Hits allowed; R = Runs allowed; ER = Earned runs allowed; HR = Home runs allowed; BB = Walks allowed; K = Strikeouts  

Awards
Team MVP and Twins Most Outstanding Rookie:  Miguel Sanó, at 22 the youngest player to be named Twins MVP and just the second to win the award as a rookie, joining Tony Oliva in 1964.

Farm system

LEAGUE CHAMPIONS: Chattanooga

References

External links
2015 Minnesota Twins season at Baseball Reference''

Minnesota Twins seasons
Minnesota Twins
Minnesota Twins